Nova Gradiška railway station is a railway station on Novska–Tovarnik railway in Croatia. Located in Nova Gradiška. Railroad continued to Okučani in one and the other direction to Staro Petrovo Selo. Nova Gradiška railway station consists of 6 railway track.

See also 
 Croatian Railways
 Zagreb–Belgrade railway

References 

Railway stations in Croatia
Buildings and structures in Brod-Posavina County